Arto Savolainen (born 3 February 1941) is a Finnish wrestler. He competed in the men's freestyle lightweight at the 1964 Summer Olympics.

References

External links
 

1941 births
Living people
Finnish male sport wrestlers
Olympic wrestlers of Finland
Wrestlers at the 1964 Summer Olympics
Sportspeople from Oulu